The Cedar Rapids Metropolitan Statistical Area, as defined by the United States Census Bureau, is an area consisting of three counties in Iowa, anchored by the city of Cedar Rapids. As of the 2010 census, the MSA had a population of 257,940, and a 2013 population estimate of 262,421.

The Cedar Rapids MSA is part of a Combined Statistical Area (CSA) with the Iowa City MSA. The area is marketed regionally as Iowa City-Cedar Rapids (ICR), or the "Corridor" (referring to the Interstate 380 corridor) which includes both the Cedar Rapids and Iowa City metropolitan areas and several surrounding counties.

Counties
Benton
Jones
Linn

Communities

Places with more than 100,000 inhabitants
Cedar Rapids (Principal city)

Places with 30,000 to 50,000 inhabitants
Marion

Places with 5,000 to 30,000 inhabitants
Hiawatha
Anamosa

Places with 1,000 to 5,000 inhabitants
Atkins
Belle Plaine
Cascade (partial)
Center Point
Central City
Ely
Fairfax
Lisbon
Monticello
Mount Vernon
Palo
Robins
Springville
Urbana
Vinton
Walford

Places with 500 to 1,000 inhabitants
Alburnett
Blairstown
Coggon
Keystone
Newhall
Olin
Shellsburg
Van Horne
Walker
Wyoming
Swisher

Places with fewer than 500 inhabitants
Bertram
Center Junction
Garrison
Luzerne
Martelle
Morley
Mount Auburn
Norway
Onslow
Oxford Junction
Prairieburg

Demographics

As of the census of 2010, there were 257,940 people, 104,617 households, and 67,059 families residing within the MSA. The racial makeup of the MSA was 92.0% White, 3.4% African American, 0.3% Native American, 1.5% Asian, 0.1% Pacific Islander, 0.6% from other races, and 2.1% from two or more races. Hispanic or Latino of any race were 2.4% of the population.

According to the 2010 American Community Survey 1-Year Estimates, the median income for a household in the MSA was $53,755, and the median income for a family was $67,506. Males had a median income of $47,371 versus $36,167 for females. The per capita income for the MSA was $27,553.

See also
Iowa census statistical areas
Cedar Rapids, IA

References

 
Populated places in Linn County, Iowa
Populated places in Benton County, Iowa
Populated places in Jones County, Iowa